Masked is a 1920 American short silent Western film directed by Mack V. Wright and featuring Hoot Gibson.

Cast
 Hoot Gibson
 Virginia Browne Faire
 Dan Crimmins
 Nelson McDowell
 Jim Corey
 Tom London

See also
 Hoot Gibson filmography

External links
 

1920 films
1920 Western (genre) films
1920 short films
American silent short films
American black-and-white films
Films directed by Mack V. Wright
Silent American Western (genre) films
1920s American films
1920s English-language films